Master Minds is a 1949 comedy film by Monogram Pictures.  It is the sixteenth film in The Bowery Boys series.

Plot
Sach has eaten too much candy, which gives him a toothache that allows him to predict the future.  Slip and Gabe come up with an idea to make money from this and put him in a sideshow carnival.  A mad scientist sees Sach's photo in the newspaper and reads about his ability. He visits the carnival where after seeing Sach in action he decides to kidnap him so he can transfer his brain into the brain of Atlas, a Frankenstein type humanoid creature.

The boys attempt to rescue Sach, but are captured themselves.  Meanwhile Sach and Atlas have had their brains swapped temporarily and Louie has arrived in the hopes of rescuing all of them.  He dons a knight's armor and temporarily outwits the scientists, but is eventually captured as well.  However, the police, who Louie tried to alert earlier, arrive and arrest the scientists.  Slip then tries to put Sach back on display at the carnival, but Sach says he no longer has a toothache because he swallowed it.

Cast

The Bowery Boys
 Leo Gorcey as Terrance Aloysius 'Slip' Mahoney
 Huntz Hall as Horace Debussy 'Sach' Jones
 William Benedict as Whitey
 David Gorcey as Chuck
 Bennie Bartlett as Butch

Remaining cast
 Gabriel Dell as Gabe Moreno
 Bernard Gorcey as Louie Dumbrowski
 Alan Napier as Dr. Druzik
 Skelton Knaggs as Hugo
 Glenn Strange as Atlas
 William Yetter as Otto
 Jane Adams as Nancy Marlowe

Production
Bennie Bartlett temporarily left the series after this film. He would be replaced by Buddy Gorman for the next seven films.

Released after Abbott and Costello Meet Frankenstein, the tagline "The Bowery Boys Meet the Monster" is used in the film's trailer, but that title was not used until the 1954 film. The Bowery Boys Meet the Monsters

Release
The film was released by Monogram Pictures on November 29, 1949.

Home media
Warner Archives released the film on made-to-order DVD in the United States as part of "The Bowery Boys, Volume One" on November 23, 2012.

References

External links
 
 
 
 

1940s American films
1940s English-language films
1940s monster movies
1949 films
1949 comedy films
American black-and-white films
American comedy films
American comedy horror films
American monster movies
Bowery Boys films
Films directed by Jean Yarbrough
Mad scientist films
Monogram Pictures films